The 2017 Arkansas State Red Wolves baseball team represented the Arkansas State University during the 2017 NCAA Division I baseball season. The Red Wolves played their home games at Tomlinson Stadium–Kell Field.

Schedule and results
Arkansas State announced its 2017 baseball schedule on November 8, 2016. The 2017 schedule consists of 32 home and 24 away games in the regular season. The Red Wolves will host Sun Belts foes Georgia State, Little Rock, Louisiana–Monroe, South Alabama, and Texas–Arlington and will travel to Appalachian State, Coastal Carolina, Georgia Southern, Louisiana–Lafayette, and Texas State.

The 2017 Sun Belt Conference Championship will be contested May 24–28 in Statesboro, Georgia, and will be hosted by Georgia Southern.

 Rankings are based on the team's current  ranking in the Collegiate Baseball poll.

References

Arkansas State
Arkansas State Red Wolves baseball seasons